The Poppy War is a 2018 novel by R. F. Kuang, published by Harper Voyager. The Poppy War, a grimdark fantasy, draws its plot and politics from mid-20th-century China, with the conflict in the novel based on the Second Sino-Japanese War, and an atmosphere inspired by the Song dynasty.
A sequel, The Dragon Republic, was released in August 2019, and a third book, The Burning God was released November 2020.

Harper Voyager's editorial director David Pomerico acquired the novel after a heated auction on Kuang's 20th birthday.

Plot
The novel centers on a poor orphan, Rin, who studies in secret to test into the elite Sinegard Academy. Kuang said Rin's life is meant to parallel the trajectory of Mao Zedong. Grounded in the real-world history of Chinese wars and adding a fantasy drug element inspired by the Opium Wars, The Poppy War is a dark and fatalistic tale of warfare. When a conflict surfaces between the Nikara Empire and their neighboring nation, the Federation of Mugen, Rin is called to the front lines. She must decide whether to make a deal with the gods to unleash her shamanic powers. Her decision may change the war but result in the loss of her humanity.

Inspiration
Kuang wrote The Poppy War while teaching debate in China and graduated with a degree in Chinese History from Georgetown University a few days after its release. Her studies in Chinese military strategy and collective trauma inspired her to write the novel. She said, "I chose to write a fantasy reinterpretation of China's twentieth century, because that was the kind of story I wasn't finding on bookshelves".

Reception
The Poppy War was a 2018 Nebula Award nominee, and was named one of the best books of the year by several publications and organizations, including The Washington Post, Time, The Guardian, Paste, Vulture, Bustle, and The Verge. It has received endorsements from authors Fonda Lee, Julie C. Dao, and Kameron Hurley. It was also nominated for the World Fantasy Award for Best Novel.

Publishers Weekly called the book "a strong and dramatic launch to Kuang's career," while Michael Nam, writing in New York Daily News, referred to The Poppy War as an ambitious start to a trilogy.

Lila Garrott in Locus gave the novel a more critical review: "It's well executed for what it does, but it's a shame that Kuang chose to downplay the more original elements in favor of material that has been seen before. All of the novel's ambition seems to have gone into the worldbuilding and magic system and then not been allowed to affect the actual plot." In his Wired commentary on fantasy tropes, Jason Kehe agreed that the material did not represent a "revolution" in the genre, but said that "Kuang manages to pierce through."

Translations
, The Poppy War has been translated into 14 languages in addition to its native English.

References

External links
 
 

2018 American novels
Dark fantasy novels
HarperCollins books
Books by R.F. Kuang